Governor Hennessy may refer to:

James Hennessy (diplomat) (born 1923), Governor of British Honduras from 1980 to 1981
John Pope Hennessy (1834–1891), Governor of Labuan, the Gold Coast, Sierra Leone, the Bahamas, Barbados and the Windward Islands, Hong Kong, and Mauritius for various terms between 1867  and 1889